Monaldi is an Italian surname. Notable people with the surname include:

 Diego Monaldi (born 1993), Italian professional basketball player
 Paolo Monaldi (1710–after 1779), Italian painter of the late-Baroque or Rococo style
 Rita Monaldi (born 1966), Italian journalist and writer
 Vincenzo Monaldi (1899–1969), Italian physician and physiologist

Other
 Monaldi & Sorti, pen name of the Italian married couple writer duo Rita Monaldi and Francesco Sorti  

Italian-language surnames